The Tanzania gecko (Ancylodactylus uzungwae) is a species of gecko endemic to Tanzania.

References

Ancylodactylus
Reptiles described in 1986